Phyllium letiranti is a species of phasmid or walking leaf of the genus Phyllium. It is currently only found in Peleng, Indonesia.

Description
Phyllium  letiranti is found on Peleng Island, Indonesia. It is recognized as a distinct species because of its moroplogical differences. Though similarities can be seen in other phyllium, unique features separate the species. 
Phyllium  letiranti is most  similar  to  Phyllium (Ph.) mamasaense Größer, 2008. This is realistic based on geographic proximity as well. It is likely that through more analysis and research of this cryptic species group more species will arise.

Diet and habitat
Phyllium are known to feed on various tropical tree leaves including, Guava, Mango, and
Bramble (Rubus sp.). This particular species is currently only known from Tataba, a village in Indonesia, though it is assumed their range may be larger. This is a leading drive for more research in the future. Given their incredible camouflage, it is challenging to find these individuals in the wild, however successful efforts have been made through blacklight trapping.

Etymology
Named to honor, collections manager of the Montreal Insectarium, Stephane Le Tirant. Le Tirant, is a prominent entomologist specializing in scarab beetles but who also has always had a passion for walking leafs. As a result of his travels and insect collection, valuable entomological research and discovery are made possible.

References

Phylliidae
Phasmatodea of Malesia